Jude Idada is a Nigerian actor, poet, playwright and producer best known for writing the feature film, The Tenant. He has also produced and written several other short films and books.

Early life and education
Idada, a descent of Edo, was born and raised in Lagos, Nigeria.

Idada was a pure science student in high school without any background in the arts. He initially applied to study medicine in the university but later, he changed his course of study to agricultural economics. After a couple of semesters in agriculture, Idada quit studying agricultural economics and stayed at home for nine months after which, he got admitted to the University of Ibadan to study theater arts where he had his first degree.

Career
After graduation, Idada worked at Guardian Express Bank, a job he got while he was still a corps member after which he moved to Arthur Andersen. He immigrated to Canada, did a postgraduate and worked in banks, telecommunication firms and along that line. After seeing a short film with friends, he resigned his job to pursue writing and film production.

He was selected as one of the screenwriters for the Toronto International Film Festival's Adapt This! and the Afrinolly/Ford Foundation Cinema4Change projects. Idada was also an inaugural participant in the Relativity Media/AFRIFF Filmmaking project.

He is the Artistic director of the Africa Theatre Ensemble in Toronto, Canada. Idada has stage plays, collection of short stories, poetry to his credit. Stage plays: Flood, Brixton Stories, Lost and Coma, 3some. He has also written and published a collection of short stories: A Box of Chocolates, Exotica Celestica. Written and directed  Stage plays: Oduduwa – King of the Edos, By My Own Hands and a children's book Didi Kanu and the Singing Dwarfs of the North.

As an acting coach, Idada teaches a wide variety of thespians, the rudiments and technicalities of acting for stage and for film. He has also guest lectured for the African Theatre Ensemble in Canada, the Mofilm/Unilever Sunlight Foundation Film Project in Nigeria, the AIDS foundation in Guyana and also chaired several panels at International Film Festivals and writing for various magazines.

Filmography

Film
Chameleon  (Short Film) – 2016 – Writer/Director
Blaze Up The Ghetto  (Documentary) – 2010 – Director
The Tenant (Feature Film) – 2005 – Writer/Producer
Inside  (Short Film) – 2000 – Director/Producer
The Woman in my Closet – (Short Film) – 1999 – Director/Producer
Young Wise Fools – (Short Film) – 1999 – Director/Producer

Stage plays
3some   by Idada – 2018 – Director/Producer
Coma  by Idada – 2013 – Director
Lost  by Modupe Olaogun – 2013 – Director
Brixton Stories  by Biyi Bandele – 2012 – Director
The Flood by Femi Osofisan – 2011 – Director
In The Name of The Father  – 2008 – Writer/Director 
The Seed of Life – 2008 – Writer/Director 
Love is the Word – 2007 – Writer/Director
Your God is Dead – 2000 – Director/Writer/Producer
Power of Love – 1999 – Director/Writer/Producer
Snares of Lucifer – 1998 – Director/Writer/Producer

Writing credits

Screenplays
Simi (feature film) – 2016 – For Applegazer and Karmacause Productions, producer, Udoka Oyeka
Tatu (Feature film) – 2016 – For Filmhouse Productions, producer, Don Omope
The River (feature film) – 2015 – For Applegazer and Karmacause Productions, Producer Orode Uduaghan
House Girls (TV Series) – 2015 – For Xandria Productions; Producers, Chineze Anyaene, Theophilus Ukpaa.
Driving Mr Akin (feature film) – 2015 – For Xandra Productions, producer, Chineze Anyaene.
Doctor Death (feature film) – 2014 – For Raconteur/Creoternity Productions, Producer Chioma Onyenwe
The Road (Short film) – 2014 – For Afrinolly/Ford Foundation
Justice (Short film) – 2014 – For Elvina Ibru Productions
Sunshine (feature film) – 2013
Coma (Feature Film) – 2012 – For I Take Media, Producers, Fabian Lojede, Mickey Dube
Journeys of One (Feature Film) – 2011 – For Omcomm Communications, Producer; Soledad Grognett
Lagos Connection (Feature Film) – 2011 – For 1 Take Media, Producer; Fabian Lojede
Afreeka (Feature Film) – 2010
The Drum (Feature Film) – 2010
Sex in the Age of Innocence (Feature Film)  – 2009
No More An Uncle Tom (Feature Film) – 2009
The Dilemma (Feature Film) – 2008
Ghetto Red Hot (Feature Film) – 2007 – (Optioned)
Mirage (Feature Film) – 2006
Kite (Feature Film) – 2006 – for NTFG Productions, Producer Yifei Zhang
The Tenant (Feature Film) – 2005 – released 2008 by Broken Manacles Entertainment 
Somewhere in Between (Feature Film) – 2005 (Optioned)
Faces of a Coin (Feature Film) – 2004 (Optioned)
Inside – (Short Film) – 2000
The Woman in my Closet – (Short Film) – 1999
Young Wise Fools – (Short Film) – 1999
Two Faces of a Coin (Short Film) – 1998

Stage plays
Sankara – 2016 – Commissioned by G.R.I.P media
MKO – 2016 – Commissioned by the MKO Abiola family
3some – 2016 – Optioned by Make It Happen Productions
The March – 2016 – Optioned by Theatre Magnifica
Resurrection – 2014 – Optioned by Oracles Repertory Theatre
The Calling – 2013 – Commissioned by African Theatre Ensemble
Coma – 2012 – Optioned by Oracles Repertory Theatre
In The Name of The Father – 2008 – Performed by the Visionaries
The Seed of Life – 2008 – Performed by the Visionaires
Love is the Word – 2007 – Performed by the Visionaires
Vendetta – 2006 – Optioned by the Africa Theatre Ensemble
Oduduwa "King of the Edos" – 2005 – Performed by the Oracle Repertory Theatre
Published by Createspace/Creoternity Books
Power of Love – 1994 – Performed by Neighbours International
Your God is Dead – 1994 – Performed by Neighbours International
Snares of Lucifer – 1993 – Performed by Neighbours International

Novels

More than Comedy (A Biography of Efosa ‘Efex’ Iyamu) – 2015 
Didi Kanu and the Singing Dwarfs of the North – 2015- Createspace/Creoternity Books
By My Own Hands – 2014 – Createspace/Creoternity Books
A Box of Chocolates – 2005 – Trafford Publishing (Collection of Short Stories)
Boom Boom – 2019 – Winepress Publishing

Poetry

Exotica Celestica – 2012 – Createspace/Creoternity Books
Meditations of a Traveling Mind – 2004
Oh My Lord! – 1992

Songs
Firefly – 2016 – Chibie; Producer: Brian Quaye, Chibie Okoye
Life is Sweet– 2013 – Chibie; Producer: Jeff McCulloch
Speed Demon – 2013– Chibie; Producer: Jeff McCulloch
Revolution – 2013 – Chibie; Producer: Soji Oyinsan
I No Be Tenant – 2010 – Blacko Blaze ft Chibie; Producer: Blacko Blaze, Released by Broken Manacles Entertainment

Acting credits
8 Bars and A Clef  (Feature Film) – Dir Chioma Onyenwe – 2014
The Tenant (Feature Film)  – Dir Lucky Ejim – 2006
Death and the Kings Horseman (Stage Play) – Dir Ronald Wiehs – 2004
The Prize (Stage Play) – Dir Lekan Fagbade  – 2000
Inside (Short Film) – Dir Idada – 2000
Ezenwanyi (Stage Play) – Dir Chetachukwu Udo – Ukpai – 1999
The Woman in my Closet (Short Film) – Dir Idada – 1999
Young Wise Fools ( Short Film) – Dir Idada – 1999
Doom (Stage Play) – Dir Yacoub Adeleke – 1997
Grip Am (Stage Play) – Dir Dare Fasasi  – 1997
Hopes of the Living Dead (Stage Play) – Dir Lekan Fagbade – 1998
Queen Idia (Stage Play) – Dir Israel Eboh −1998
Human Zoo (Stage Play) – Dir Dare Fasasi – 1997
Snares of Lucifer (Stage Play) – Dir Idada, Ifeanyi Agu – 1993, 1997
Your God is Dead (Stage Play) – Dir Idada – 1994
Power of Love (Stage Play)- Dir Idada  – 1994, 1999
Eku (Stage  Play) – Dir Wale Macaulay – 1995
Atakiti (Stage Play) – Dir Esikinni Olusanyin – 1995

Awards and recognition

References

External links

Nigerian screenwriters
Living people
People from Edo State
University of Ibadan alumni
Nigerian film directors
Year of birth missing (living people)
Nigerian film producers
Residents of Lagos